Acronicta lutea is a moth of the family Noctuidae. It is found in the Korean Peninsula, China, eastern Siberia (Transbaikalia), Japan (Honshu), Mongolia and the Russian Far East (Amur region, Khabarovsk, Primorye, southern Sakhalin).

External links
Korean Insects

Acronicta
Moths of Asia
Moths described in 1852